Steinshamn is a village in Ålesund Municipality in Møre og Romsdal county, Norway. The village is located at the northern end of the island of Harøya. There is a causeway that connects Steinshamn to the neighboring island of Finnøya to the northeast.

The village was the administrative centre of the old Sandøy Municipality until 2020.

References

Villages in Møre og Romsdal
Ålesund